This is a list of board games. See the article on game classification for other alternatives, or see Category:Board games for a list of board game articles.

Single-player board games
Some board games have solo variants, such as Arkham Horror and Agricola. Others are specifically designed for one player.

Two-player abstract strategy games

In abstract strategy games, players know the entire game state at all times, and random generators such as dice are not used.

Two-player board games

Multi-player elimination board games
Participants are typically eliminated before game end.

European race games

Multiplayer games without elimination
Everyone can play along to the end. These games are especially suited for mixed play with adults and children.

Economics strategy games
Games involving scarce resources and strategy.

Games of physical skill
Coordination, finesse, or other physical skills are necessary. Also known as dexterity games.

Children's games
The rules are easy to learn and the outcome is mostly or entirely due to chance.

Cooperative games
Cooperative games in which all players need to work together to win.

Word games
These games are based on construction of words to score points.

Gaming systems
These are sets that can be used to play multiple games.

See also

Spiel des Jahres (Game of the Year)
Games 100
List of board wargames
List of Japanese board games
List of mancala games
List of board game publishers
List of game manufacturers
List of cross and circle games

External links
Board Game Geek
Boardgames.org
A Zen Guide to Board Games
Gamerate Game database
Board Games Land
Board Game Theories

Board games